NGC 1052 is an elliptical galaxy in the constellation Cetus. It was discovered on January 10, 1785 by the astronomer William Herschel. It is a member of the eponymous NGC 1052 Group.

Features 
NGC 1052 is located at a distance of around 63 million light years from the Milky Way, and has a LINER-type active galactic nucleus which signals the intense starburst activity in the galaxy's center that were confirmed with observations with better resolution showing a number of star-forming regions and young star clusters.

NGC 1052 shows also two small jets emerging from its nucleus as well as a very extended disc of neutral hydrogen, far larger than the galaxy itself. Additionally, the stars and the ionized gas rotate along different axes. All these features suggesting a gas-rich galaxy collided and merged with it 1 billion years ago producing all the above features.

The shape of NGC 1052 is thought to be a triaxial ellipsoid. The longest axis of the ellipsoid is probably aligned at a position angle of −41°, which is the axis around which the ionized gas would be rotating.

A scale image of NGC 1052 and its satellite galaxies is available at the reference.

Central black hole
NGC 1052 hosts a rapidly rotating supermassive black hole with a mass of 154 million  with a large magnetic field of between 0.02 and 8.3 Tesla, which, according to PhD student Anne-Kathrin Baczko, the leader of the team that made this discovery, provides enough magnetic energy to power the previously mentioned twin relativistic jets.

The location of this black hole is the most precisely known in the universe, with the exception of Sagittarius A*, the supermassive black hole found at the heart of our own galaxy.

See also
NGC 1052-DF2, a galaxy assumed to be associated with NGC 1052, and which appears to have little or no dark matter
NGC 1052-DF4, another galaxy assumed to be associated with NGC 1052, and which appears to have little or no dark matter

References

External links 
 

Elliptical galaxies
1052
Cetus (constellation)
LINER galaxies
010175